The 2013–14 SV Darmstadt 98 season was the club's 116th season. This was the club's 3rd season in the 3. Liga overall and since promotion.

Background

SV Darmstadt 98 played their 3rd season in the new formed 3. Liga after having escaped relegation due to local rivals Kickers Offenbach having their licence revoked due to insolvency.

Competitions

3. Liga

League table

References

SV Darmstadt 98 seasons
Darmstadt